Paul Karoly Pesthy (March 25, 1938 – October 28, 2008) was an American modern pentathlete and épée fencer. He was born in Hungary and emigrated to the United States in 1958.

Competitions
He was a member of the U.S. Olympic modern pentathlon team and won a silver medal in the team event at the 1964 Summer Olympics. He also qualified for the 1968 Olympic team.  He was USFA/AFLA national épée champion (1964, 1966, 1967, 1968, 1983) and was a member of the U.S. Olympic fencing team in 1964, 1968, 1976 and 1980. Although Pesthy qualified for the 1980 Olympic fencing team he did not compete due to the Olympic Committee's boycott of the 1980 Summer Olympics in Moscow, Russia. He was one of 461 athletes to receive a Congressional Gold Medal instead. He won the World Team Bronze in 1962 and 1963. He was IFA épée champion (1964) and two-time NCAA épée champion in 1964 and 1965 for Rutgers University. He is a member of the United States Fencing Association Hall of Fame.

See also
List of USFA Division I National Champions

References

External links
 

1938 births
2008 deaths
American male épée fencers
American male modern pentathletes
Olympic fencers of the United States
Fencers at the 1964 Summer Olympics
Fencers at the 1968 Summer Olympics
Fencers at the 1976 Summer Olympics
Modern pentathletes at the 1964 Summer Olympics
Olympic silver medalists for the United States in modern pentathlon
Sportspeople from Budapest
Hungarian emigrants to the United States
Medalists at the 1964 Summer Olympics
Pan American Games medalists in fencing
Pan American Games gold medalists for the United States
Pan American Games silver medalists for the United States
Pan American Games bronze medalists for the United States
Congressional Gold Medal recipients
Competitors at the 1967 Pan American Games
Fencers at the 1975 Pan American Games
Fencers at the 1979 Pan American Games
Fencers at the 1983 Pan American Games
20th-century American people
Medalists at the 1967 Pan American Games
Medalists at the 1975 Pan American Games
Medalists at the 1979 Pan American Games
Medalists at the 1983 Pan American Games